Olivia Anakwe is an American fashion model.

Early life and education 
Anakwe, who is of Nigerian heritage, was born in Bucks County, Pennsylvania. She began college at the University of Pittsburgh and transferred to Pace University where she graduated summa cum laude with a bachelor's degree in psychology.

Career 
Anakwe was discovered while visiting her sister in New York City. She signed to Elite Model Management and walked in 40 shows during her first season, including Miu Miu, Marc Jacobs, Jacquemus, Thom Browne, Kate Spade, Emilio Pucci, Preen by Thornton Bregazzi, and Prabal Gurung. She has appeared in advertisements for Glossier and YSL Beauté, as well as Marc Jacobs, Bobbi Brown, and Pat McGrath. Anakwe has appeared in editorials for Vogue, Vogue Italia, Vogue Japan, Vogue Korea, and W among others.

References 

Living people
People from Bucks County, Pennsylvania
University of Pittsburgh alumni
Pace University alumni
African-American female models
American people of Nigerian descent
Elite Model Management models
Year of birth missing (living people)